Trit may refer to:
 Ternary digit, see Ternary numeral system
 Tirit, an ancient recipe using leftovers